The Rutherford Memorial Lecture is an international lecture of the Royal Society created under the Rutherford Memorial Scheme in 1952. It is held at universities in various countries in the Commonwealth, with a stipulation that at least one of every three lectures must be held in New Zealand.

List of lecturers

References 

 Royal Society Rutherford Lectures (to 2010)
 Rutherford Memorial lecturers

Royal Society lecture series
Lecture series